Gulf Cup may also refer to:

 UAE Arabian Gulf Cup, former sponsorship name of the UAE League Cup.
 Persian Gulf Cup, former name of the Persian Gulf Pro League for Iranian club association football teams.
 Gulf Club Champions Cup, former name of the GCC Champions League.